Kaveri is a 1975 Indian Kannada-language film, directed and produced by H. N. Reddy. The film stars Bharathi, Rajesh, Pandari Bai and Kumari Surekha. The film has musical score by M. Ranga Rao.

Cast

Bharathi
Rajesh
Pandari Bai
Kumari Surekha
K. S. Ashwath
T. N. Balakrishna
Sampath
Venkatarao Thalageri
Maluru Sonnappa
Dr N. Narayanaswamy in Guest appearance
B. Y. Ramadas in Guest appearance
Chinnadagani Chalam in Guest appearance
Srinivas in Guest appearance
Ramachandra in Guest appearance
H. B. Krishnappa in Guest appearance
Gadibidi Lakkanna in Guest appearance
Master Nagaraj in Guest appearance

Soundtrack
The music was composed by M. Ranga Rao.

References

External links
 

1970s Kannada-language films
Films scored by M. Ranga Rao